San Juan Bautista is the Spanish-language name of Saint John the Baptist. It may refer to:

Places

Bolivia
San Juan Bautista, Bolivia, Jesuit mission ruins near the village of San Juan de Taperas

Chile
San Juan Bautista, Chile, Juan Fernández Islands

Guatemala
San Juan Bautista, Suchitepéquez

Mexico
San Juan Bautista, Coahuila
San Juan Bautista, Guerrero
a mission founded 1699/1700 near Guerrero, Coahuila
San Juan Bautista, Nayarit
San Juan Bautista de la Villahermosa, Tabasco
Misión San Juan Bautista Malibat, Baja California Sur
Visita de San Juan Bautista Londó, Baja California Sur
any of several other Spanish missions in Mexico
San Juan Bautista Atatlahuca, Etla, Valles Centrales, Oaxaca
San Juan Bautista Coixtlahuaca, Mixteca, Oaxaca
San Juan Bautista Cuicatlan, Cuicatlan, Cañada, Oaxaca
San Juan Bautista Guelache, Etla, Valles Centrales, Oaxaca
San Juan Bautista Jayacatlán, Etla, Valles Centrales, Oaxaca
San Juan Bautista lo de Soto, Jamiltepec, Costa, Oaxaca.
San Juan Bautista de Sonora, Cumpas, Sonora
San Juan Bautista Suchitepec, Huajuapan, Mixteca, Oaxaca
San Juan Bautista Tlacoatzintepec, Cuicatlan, Cañada, Oaxaca
San Juan Bautista Tlachichilco, Silacayoapam, Mixteca, Oaxaca
San Juan Bautista Tuxtepec, Oaxaca
San Juan Bautista Valle Nacional, Tuxtepec, Papaloapan, Oaxaca

Paraguay
San Juan Bautista, Paraguay
San Juan Bautista de Ñeembucú, Ñeembucú
Roman Catholic Diocese of San Juan Bautista de las Misiones, suffragan of Asunción

Peru
San Juan Bautista District, Maynas, Loreto Region
San Juan Bautista District, Ica, Ica Region
San Juan Bautista, Ica, capital of the aforementioned district
San Juan Bautista District, Huamanga, Ayacucho Region
San Juan Bautista, Huamanga, capital of the aforementioned district

Puerto Rico
The original name of Puerto Rico
San Juan, Puerto Rico, a truncation of its complete name Municipio de la Ciudad Capital San Juan Bautista
Cathedral of San Juan Bautista in Puerto Rico (Catholic Church)
Catedral San Juan Bautista (San Juan de Puerto Rico) (Episcopal Church)
Iglesia de San Juan Bautista (Maricao, Puerto Rico)
San Juan Bautista School of Medicine, Caguas, Puerto Rico
Iglesia San Juan Bautista y San Ramón Nonato, Juana Díaz, Puerto Rico
Old San Juan, Puerto Rico

Spain
San Juan Bautista (Madrid), an area in the city of Madrid.
Sant Joan de Labritja, a village and municipality in Ibiza / Eivissa, Balearic Islands.
San Juan Bautista de Corias, a monastery in Corias (Narcea), Asturias
Iglesia de San Juan Bautista (San Tirso de Abres), Asturias
Church of San Juan Bautista, Baños de Cerrato, Palencia
Santiuste de San Juan Bautista, Segovia, Castile and León
Castle of St John the Baptist (Castillo de San Juan Bautista), Santa Cruz de Tenerife, Canary Islands
Church of San Juan Bautista (Talamanca de Jarama), Talamanca de Jarama
Church of San Juan Bautista (Arganda del Rey)
Iglesia de San Juan Bautista (Chiclana de la Frontera), Chiclana de la Frontera

United States
Mission San Juan Bautista, San Benito County, California, officially "La Misión del Glorios Precursor de Jesu Cristo, Nuestro Señor, San Juan Bautista" 
San Juan Bautista, California
Rancho San Juan Bautista, Santa Clara County, California
San Juan County, Washington (formally San Juan Bautista County, named for Saint John the Baptist)

Venezuela
San Juan Bautista, Nueva Esparta
Pao de San Juan Bautista Municipality, Cojedes
John the Baptist Monument, San Juan de los Morros, Guárico, Venezuela

Art
Painting
 St. John the Baptist in the Wilderness (1489), painting by Hieronymus Bosch. Lázaro Galdiano Museum, Madrid, Spain.
 Saint John the Baptist (1508-1513), painting by Leonardo DaVinci, Musée du Louvre, Paris, France.
 Saint John the Baptist (c. 1600), painting by El Greco, Legion of Honor, California, USA.
 Saint John the Baptist (c. 1600-1605) painting by El Greco, Museu de Belles Arts de València, Valencia, Spain.
 Sain John the Baptist in the desert (1620), painting by Diego Velázquez, Art Institute of Chicago, Illinois, USA.

Sculpture
 Saint John the Baptist (1438), wood sculpture by Donatello, Santa Maria Gloriosa dei Frari, Venecia, Italy.
 Saint John the Baptist (1455), wood sculpture by Donatello, Siena Cathedral, Italy.

Other uses
San Juan Bautista (Mutsen) a native people and language in California
Japanese warship San Juan Bautista, built in 1613
Spanish warship San Juan Bautista, a Spanish 60-gun ship 1724-1741
Church of San Juan Bautista (disambiguation)

See also
 Bautista
 San Juan (disambiguation)
 Saint-Jean-Baptiste (disambiguation)
 St. John the Baptist (disambiguation)